Wish I Were a Shark (Da mi je biti morski pas) is a 1999 Croatian film written and directed by Ognjen Sviličić, starring Vedran Mlikota and Josip Zovko.

Sources
 Da mi je biti morski pas at lzmk.hr

External links
 

1999 films
Croatian comedy films
1990s Croatian-language films
Films directed by Ognjen Sviličić
1999 directorial debut films